Leucopogon pendulus is a shrub in the family Ericaceae. It is native to Western Australia.

Description
Leucopogon pendulus is an erect shrub which grows to heights of from 0.1 m to 1.5 m. The white flowers may be seen from March to October in its native habitat.

Distribution and habitat
It is found in the IBRA Regions of: Avon Wheatbelt, Esperance Plains, Jarrah Forest, Mallee, Swan Coastal Plain, 
and Warren, on sandy and gravelly soils, on seasonally wet flats, plains, outcrops and low ridges.

Taxonomy
It was first described in 1810 by Robert Brown. The specific epithet, pendulus, is an adjective derived from the Latin verb, pendere ("to hang")  and describes the plant as having hanging (pendulous) flowers.

References

pendulus
Ericales of Australia

Eudicots of Western Australia
Plants described in 1810
Taxa named by Robert Brown (botanist, born 1773)